Wild Bill is a British television drama series which premiered on ITV on 12 June 2019. The series stars executive producer Rob Lowe, and six episodes were commissioned in October 2018.

Premise
Chief Constable Bill Hixon, a widowed former US police chief, moves from Miami to Boston, Lincolnshire with his fourteen-year-old daughter Kelsey, after being sacked from the American police force for assaulting a boy who had uploaded sexual images of his daughter. Although he makes an immediate impact on his colleagues, none appear too pleased to have an American officer around, aside from eager young trainee detective Muriel Yeardsley, with whom Bill forms an affinity after a slightly rocky initial start.

Cast
 Rob Lowe as Chief Constable Bill Hixon; head of the East Lincolnshire Police Force
 Bronwyn James as DC Muriel Yeardsley; a trainee CID detective toward whom Bill takes a particular shine
 Rachael Stirling as Lady Mary Harborough; a local crown court judge with whom Bill has an affair
 Anjli Mohindra as Deputy Chief Constable Lydia Price; Bill's second in command
 Tony Pitts as the police and crime commissioner Keith Metcalfe; Bill's manager
 Anthony Flanagan as PC Sean Cobley; a disillusioned beat cop determined not to accept Bill's new regime
 Divian Ladwa as PC Troy Drakes; PC Cobley's bumbling beat partner
 Aloreia Spencer as Kelsey Hixon; Bill's teenage daughter
 Angela Griffin as Lisa Cranston; a local journalist assigned to oversee Bill's tenure as Chief Constable
 Vicki Pepperdine as Broadbent; the force's resident pathologist
 Steffan Rhodri as DS Alex Blair; DC Yeardsley's immediate superior
 Aleksandar Jovanovic as Oleg Kraznov; a dangerous Russian businessman attempting to build a criminal empire on Bill's turf

Episodes

Production
The series stars executive producer Rob Lowe, and six episodes were commissioned in October 2018.

Filming began in November 2018, with Anjli Mohindra, Rachael Stirling and Angela Griffin confirmed to be among the cast. Aloreia Spencer, who plays Hixon's fourteen-year-old daughter Kesley, made her on-screen debut in the series.

Cancellation

On 13 November 2019, ITV announced the series was cancelled after a single series.

Broadcast
On 29 May 2019, CBC Television announced it was picking up the show, then began broadcasting it 9 March 2020.

On 4 August 2020, BritBox North America announced it would release the series for the US market, then began releasing it weekly from 4 August 2020.

Reception
The series received mixed reviews, with Lucy Mangan of The Guardian awarding the series' premiere episode three stars, writing:

The Independents two-star review described it as "grim and a bit cheapo", a "howling letdown", and "dreary".

Home media
The series was released on DVD on 29 July 2019.

Notes

References

External links 

2019 British television series debuts
2019 British television series endings
2010s British crime drama television series
2010s British comedy-drama television series
2010s British police procedural television series
2010s British television miniseries
ITV television dramas
Television series by ITV Studios
English-language television shows
Television shows set in Lincolnshire